Mossy Lea Reservoir is a disused reservoir near Glossop, north Derbyshire. In 1837, 50 local millowners and gentlemen, known as the "Glossop Commissioners",  obtained an Act of Parliament to construct the Glossop Reservoirs. Hurst Reservoir was on the Hurst Brook  and Mossy Lea Reservoir was to take water from the Shelf Brook. Only the Hurst Reservoir was constructed before the money ran out. Mossy Lea Reservoir was constructed privately in 1840 by the Duke of Norfolk. It was taken over in 1929 by the Glossop Corporation Waterworks. This became part of the Manchester Corporation Waterworks in 1959. Swineshaw Reservoir, Hurst Reservoir and Mossy Lea Reservoir are no longer in service.

See also
List of reservoirs and dams in the United Kingdom

References 

Reservoirs of the Peak District
Drinking water reservoirs in England
Works by John Frederick Bateman
Reservoirs in Derbyshire